Manthira Punnagai (or Mandhira Punnagai) may refer to:
 Manthira Punnagai (1986 film)
 Mandhira Punnagai (2010 film)
 Manthira Punnagai (TV series)